CIGB-FM is a French-language radio station located in Trois-Rivières, Quebec, Canada.

Owned and operated by Bell Media, it broadcasts on 102.3 MHz with an effective radiated power of 5,800 watts (class B) using an omnidirectional antenna.

The station has a mainstream rock format and is part of the "Énergie" network which operates across Quebec. It started operations on August 27, 1979. CIGB became wholly owned and operated by Radiomutuel (predecessor of Astral Media) in 1987, as the company bought the station, which became a sister station to the now-defunct CJTR (also in Trois-Rivières).

Notes

External links
 Énergie 102.3
 

Igb
Igb
Igb
Igb
Radio stations established in 1979
1979 establishments in Quebec